Live at the Bassline is a live album by Vusi Mahlasela and Louis Mhlanga.

Track listing
 "Ubuhle Bomhlaba"
 "Two Birds"
 "Silang Mabele"
 "Zvinoshamisa"
 "When You Come Back"
 "Fountain"
 "Basimanyana"
 "Tontobane"
 "Mai Rugare"
 "Untitled"
 "Chibona"
 "Red Song"
 "Woza"

References

Vusi Mahlasela albums
1999 live albums
Live albums by South African artists